IBWA can refer to:
 International Bottled Water Association
 International Brotherhood Welfare Association, American philanthropic organization in the early 20th century